North Lamar Transit Center is a Capital Metropolitan Transportation Authority bus station in Austin, Texas. It is located on North Lamar Boulevard on the north side of U.S. Route 183. The station features a park and ride lot and is served by several local bus routes as well as MetroRapid Route 801. As part of Project Connect, a Capital MetroRail light rail station is expected to be built at the facility; it is planned to be the northern terminus of the system, serving Blue Line and Orange Line trains.

References

External links
 via Capital Metropolitan Transportation Authority

Future Capital MetroRail stations
Bus stations in Texas
Buildings and structures in Austin, Texas
Proposed railway stations in the United States
Railway stations scheduled to open in 2029